The Henschel Hs 124 was a  twin-engine heavy fighter, attack aircraft and light bomber designed in Nazi Germany. After two prototypes had been built, work on the project was cancelled.

The first prototype had two liquid-cooled 12-cylinder Junkers Jumo 210A engines of 449 kW each (610 hp). It was fitted with a rotating turret with two 7.9 mm MG 15 machine guns in the nose.

The Hs 124 V2 had two  BMW 132Dc 9-cylinder radial engines and was armed with two 20 mm Mauser cannon, as well as a 7.9 mm MG 15 machine gun, carrying up to 600 kg of bombs.

The Hs 124 was Henschel's entry into the Luftwaffe's twin-engine Zerstörer (Destroyer) competition, losing to the Messerschmitt Bf 110.

Specifications (Hs 124 V2)

See also

References

 Green, William. Warplanes of the Third Reich. New York:Doubleday, 1972. .

External links

 Johan Visschedijk Collection

1930s German attack aircraft
Hs 124
World War II ground attack aircraft of Germany
Aircraft first flown in 1934
Twin piston-engined tractor aircraft